Kerry Carter (born December 19, 1980) is a former gridiron football fullback. He was signed by the Seattle Seahawks as an undrafted free agent in 2003 and drafted by the Alouettes in the second round of the 2003 CFL Draft. He played college football at Stanford. 

Carter was also a member of the Washington Football Team in 2006. In the first preseason game of the year against the Cincinnati Bengals, Carter made a cut in the backfield and tore his ACL.  He was released and given an injury settlement.

As a member of the Montreal Alouettes, he won the Canadian Football League's Grey Cup in the 2009 and 2010 seasons. On May 7, 2012, he was released by the Alouettes.

References

External links

Stanford Cardinal bio
Montreal Alouettes bio

1980 births
Living people
American football fullbacks
Canadian players of American football
Canadian football fullbacks
Montreal Alouettes players
Naturalized citizens of Canada
Sportspeople from Port of Spain
Players of Canadian football from Ontario
Seattle Seahawks players
Canadian football people from Toronto
Stanford Cardinal football players
Trinidad and Tobago emigrants to Canada
Washington Redskins players